Rajendra Nath Malhotra (8 June 1931 − 13 February 2008) was an Indian actor and comedian in Hindi and Punjabi films.

Early life and family
Rajendra Nath was born on 8 June 1931 in Tikamgarh, which is now in Madhya Pradesh. His family was from the Karimpura locality of Peshawar but settled in Jabalpur in Madhya Pradesh. He studied at Darbar College, Rewa, where Arjun Singh (a Congress politician) and R.P. Agarwal were his classmates.

Rajendra's elder brother Prem Nath went to Mumbai and became an actor, so Rajendra joined him in 1949. They were good friends of Raj Kapoor and Shashi Kapoor. Rajendra and Prem's sister Krishna married actor-director Raj Kapoor. He had also another brother Narendra Nath who also became an actor who usually played some villain's role in the movies.

Rajendra, who was little interested in studies, quit college and landed in Bombay to work in films like his brother. He did some plays at Prithvi theatre like Pathan and Shakuntala. It was here that he became close to Shammi Kapoor.

Career
Initially Rajendra struggled to get roles till Sashadhar Mukherjee offered him a comedian's role in Dil Deke Dekho, a film directed by Nasir Hussain, starring Shammi Kapoor and Asha Parekh. Rajendra Nath along with Asha Parekh were a regular feature in many Nasir Hussain films like Phir Wohi Dil Laya Hoon, Jab Pyar Kisi Se Hota Hai, Baharon Ke Sapne and Pyar Ka Mausam. He also played a villain's role in Hamrahi opposite Shashikala whose character he kills. He has done 187 movies. He was one of the most famous comedians. His best role as comedian was in Mere Sanam and  Phir Wohi Dil Laya Hoon. He also played the role of Hero/Second Lead in "Vachan" and "Teen Bahuraniyan". He played supporting roles in films like Dharkan by Devendra Goel and Jeevan Mrityu by Rajshri Productions. He played a buffoon called Popatlal in Jab Pyar Kisi Se Hota Hai, and since then the name became synonymous with Rajendra Nath. He used this name in the famous TV series Hum Paanch.

He then did many films, mostly in comic roles, such as in An Evening in Paris and Phir Wohi Dil Laya Hoon. One of his most applauded performances was in Manoj Kumar's Purab Aur Paschim though it was not a full-fledged comedy role.
He also contributed to Nepal's first movie Maitighar which was shot in Kathmandu, Nepal.

He starred in a number of Punjabi films such as Jatt Punjabi and "Do Posti". 

He died on 13 February 2008 from cardiac arrest.

Filmography

References

External links
 
 Rajendra Nath Profile on Rediff
 Rajendra Nath Filmography

Indian male comedians
Indian male film actors
Male actors from Madhya Pradesh
2008 deaths
1932 births
Male actors in Hindi cinema
20th-century Indian male actors
Punjabi people
People from Jabalpur
20th-century comedians
People from Tikamgarh